Never Mind 2022 was a professional wrestling event promoted by CyberFight's sub-brand DDT Pro-Wrestling (DDT). It took place on December 29, 2022, in Tokyo, Japan, at the Tokyo Dome City Hall. The event aired on CyberAgent's AbemaTV online linear television service and CyberFight's streaming service Wrestle Universe. It was the nineteenth event in the Never Mind series.

Production

Background
Since 2001, DDT began producing their year-end shows under the branch of "Never Mind". The events' traditional venue was initially the Korakuen Hall, but during the years, the promotion moved the events to other arenas. These events conclude certain feuds and rivalries built during the year. Between 2017 and 2021, the "Never Mind" series were briefly replaced by the DDT Ultimate Party as the promotion's year-closing events.

Storylines
The event featured twelve professional wrestling matches that resulted from scripted storylines, where wrestlers portrayed villains, heroes, or less distinguishable characters in the scripted events that built tension and culminated in a wrestling match or series of matches.

Event
There were a total of three title matches during the show. In the first of them, Burning (Tetsuya Endo, Kotaro Suzuki and Yusuke Okada) defeated Kazuki Hirata, Toru Owashi and Naruki Doi to win the KO-D 6-Man Tag Team Championship. Endo Suzuki and Okada received a challenge from Pheromones after the match. In the second one, Jun Akiyama successfully defended the DDT Extreme Championship against Super Sasadango Machine in a comedic match which started with both wrestlers who sat down in the middle of the ring playing with their respective toy action figures. The match got physical and solded with Akiyama's victory. The main event saw Kazusada Higuchi securing his fifth consecutive defense of the KO-D Openweight Championship over the 2022 D-Oh Grand Prix winner Yuki Ueno. Higuchi received a challenge from Yuji Hino after the match.

Results

References

External links
The official DDT Pro-Wrestling website

DDT Pro-Wrestling shows
CyberAgent
2022 in professional wrestling
December 2022 events in Japan
Professional wrestling in Tokyo